The James P. White House is a historic house at 1 Church Street in Belfast, Maine.  Built in 1840, it is one of the city's most elaborate examples of Greek Revival architecture.  It was listed on the National Register of Historic Places in 1973, and is included in Belfast's Church Street Historic District.  In recent years it has served as a bed and breakfast inn but, as of 2015, is a private residence once again.

Description and history
The White House is located south of Belfast's central business district, at the southern end of Church Street, occupying a triangular lot at the corner of High Street.  It is a two-story wood-frame structure, with a hip roof topped by a widow's walk and cupola, and a granite foundation.  The front and sides are finished in flushboard siding, with clapboards elsewhere.  The building corners have oversides pilasters with Doric capitals, rising to a multi-level entablature that encircles the building.  The main facade is three bays wide, the center one projecting and rising to a gabled roof.  The main entrance, and a second floor balcony entrance, are both recessed in this projecting, the recessed area articulated by pilasters and fluted columns.

The house was designed by Calvin Ryder, a local architect, for James Patterson White, and was completed in 1840.  White, a Belfast native, was a successful businessman who served for two years as mayor.  Later owners of the house have included James Taliaferro, a Florida Senator who owned it as a summer residence.  In the late 20th century the building served as a bed and breakfast inn.  By 2015, the White House is a private residence once again.

See also
National Register of Historic Places listings in Waldo County, Maine

References

Houses on the National Register of Historic Places in Maine
Greek Revival architecture in Maine
Houses completed in 1840
Houses in Waldo County, Maine
Buildings and structures in Belfast, Maine
National Register of Historic Places in Waldo County, Maine
Historic district contributing properties in Maine